Kuchař (feminine Kuchařová) is a Czech surname meaning "cook". It is related to Kukhar and Kuchar. Notable people with the surname include:

 Ada Kuchařová, Czech orienteer
 Jan Křtitel Kuchař (1751–1829), Czech musician
 Josef Kuchař, Czech footballer
 Taťána Kuchařová, Czech model
 Tomáš Kuchař (born 1976), Czech footballer

Czech-language surnames
Occupational surnames